Uncial 0310 (in the Gregory-Aland numbering), is a Greek uncial manuscript of the New Testament. Palaeographically it has been assigned to the 6th-century.

Description 

The codex contains a small texts of the Epistle to Titus 2:15-3:6; 3:6-7, on a fragment of the one parchment leaf. The original size of the leaf is unknown.

It is written in two columns per page, 25 lines per page (survived only 6 lines), in uncial letters.

Currently it is dated by the INTF to the 6th-century.

It is currently housed at the Cambridge University Library (Or. 161699 Π X) in Cambridge.

See also 

 List of New Testament uncials
 Biblical manuscript
 Textual criticism

References

External links 
 

Greek New Testament uncials
6th-century biblical manuscripts